is a former Japanese football player.

Playing career
Furukawa was born in Gonohe, Aomori on September 21, 1972. After graduating from Sendai University, he joined Japan Football League (JFL) club Otsuka Pharmaceutical in 1995. He played as a regular center back from first season. In 1997, he moved to JFL club Consadole Sapporo. The club won second place in 1997 and was promoted to the J1 League from 1998. Although he played many matches in 1998, the club was relegated to the J2 League from 1999. In 1999, he played as a regular player and the club won the championship in 2000 and was promoted to J1 in 2001 again. However his opportunity to play decreased from 2001. In 2003, he moved to J2 club Montedio Yamagata. He played as a regular player and retired at the end of the 2004 season.

Club statistics

References

External links

1972 births
Living people
Sendai University alumni
Association football people from Aomori Prefecture
Japanese footballers
J1 League players
J2 League players
Japan Football League (1992–1998) players
Tokushima Vortis players
Hokkaido Consadole Sapporo players
Montedio Yamagata players
Association football defenders